GenealogyJ is a viewer and editor for genealogic data, suitable for hobbyists, family historians and genealogy researchers. GenealogyJ is written in Java and so is available on most platforms and supports the GEDCOM standard. Many reports like family tree, table, timeline and geography are available.

References

External links
 

Free genealogy software
Free software programmed in Java (programming language)